Buckinbah Parish  is a civil parish of Gordon County, New South Wales, a Cadastral divisions of New South Wales.

Location
The Parish is between Molong, New South Wales and Wellington, New South Wales and the (inactive) Molong–Dubbo railway line passes through the parish, The only town of the parish is Yeoval, New South Wales though a siding is located at Yallundry.

History
Buckinbah parish is named for Buckinbah Station, the first home to Banjo Paterson.

In 1868, gold, silver and copper were discovered in Buckinbah.

References

Parishes of Gordon County (New South Wales)